Homalopoma albidum, common name the white dwarf turban, is a species of sea snail, a marine gastropod mollusk in the family Colloniidae.

Description

Distribution
This species occurs in the Caribbean Sea, the Gulf of Mexico and the Lesser Antilles; in the Atlantic Ocean off North Carolina at depths between 64 m and 1832 m.

References

 Turgeon, D.D., et al. 1998. Common and scientific names of aquatic invertebrates of the United States and Canada. American Fisheries Society Special Publication 26 page(s): 59

External links
 Dall, W. H. 1881. Reports on the results of dredging, under the supervision of Alexander Agassiz, in the Gulf of Mexico, and in the Caribbean Sea, 1877–79, by the United States Coast Survey Steamer Blake. Bulletin of the Museum of Comparative Zoology 9: 33–144
 
 Rosenberg, G., F. Moretzsohn, and E. F. García. 2009. Gastropoda (Mollusca) of the Gulf of Mexico, Pp. 579–699 in Felder, D.L. and D.K. Camp (eds.), Gulf of Mexico–Origins, Waters, and Biota. Biodiversity. Texas A&M Press, College Station, Texas

Colloniidae
Gastropods described in 1881